Anastasia Hille (born 1965) is an English film, television and theatre actress, and ceramicist. Born in London, she was a student at London's Drama Centre and won second prize at the Ian Charleson Awards in 1994 (the first prize was awarded to Toby Stephens and the third prize to Jude Law). She has twice been nominated for the Olivier Award for Best Supporting Actress, for The Master Builder at the Almeida Theatre in 2011, and for The Effect at the National's Cottesloe Theatre in 2013.

Hille was nominated for the 2013 BAFTA TV Award for Best Supporting Actress for the 2012 miniseries The Fear. Her other TV roles include Kavanagh QC: The Sweetest Thing (1995), Trial & Retribution (1997), as Carole Lombard in RKO 281 (2000), The Cazalets (2001), Agatha Christie's Poirot: Three Act Tragedy (2010), and The Missing (2016). Her film roles include The Hole (2001), The Abandoned (2006), Snow White & the Huntsman (2012), and A United Kingdom (2016).

Filmography

Film

Television

Theatre

Awards and nominations

See also
 List of Jeeves and Wooster characters

References

External links

 Celebdomain.com picture

1965 births
English film actresses
English stage actresses
English television actresses
Living people
Actresses from London